Lectionary 318 (Gregory-Aland), designated by siglum ℓ 318 (in the Gregory-Aland numbering) is a Greek manuscript of the New Testament, on parchment. Palaeographically it has been assigned to the 12th century. The manuscript has survived in a fragmentary condition.

Description 

The original codex contained lessons from the Gospel of John, Matthew, and Luke (Evangelistarium), on 279 fragment parchment leaves. Some leaves at the end of the codex were lost. The leaves are measured. The last leaf was added by later hand (folio 279).

The text is written in Greek minuscule letters, in two columns per page, 23 lines per page. It has musical notes. It contains decorated headpieces and initial letters.

The codex contains weekday Gospel lessons. Lectionary 318, 321 and 323 sometimes agree with each other in departing form the ordinary weekday Church lessons.

History 

Scrivener dated the manuscript to the 13th century, Gregory dated it to the 12th or 13th century. It has been assigned by the Institute for New Testament Textual Research (INTF) to the 12th century.

It was purchased at Sotheby's, on 12 January 1854.

The manuscript was added to the list of New Testament manuscripts by Frederick Henry Ambrose Scrivener (265e) and Caspar René Gregory (number 318e). Gregory saw it in 1883.

The codex is housed at the British Library (Add MS 19737) in London.

The fragment is not cited in critical editions of the Greek New Testament (UBS4, NA28).

See also 

 List of New Testament lectionaries
 Biblical manuscript
 Textual criticism
 Lectionary 317

Notes and references

Bibliography

External links 
 Add MS 19737 Digitised Manuscripts

Greek New Testament lectionaries
12th-century biblical manuscripts
British Library additional manuscripts